William Keast may refer to:
 William Keast (New South Wales politician) (1872–1938), member of the New South Wales Legislative Assembly 
 William Keast (Victorian politician) (1866–1927), member of the Victorian Legislative Assembly
 William Rea Keast, American scholar and academic administrator